Charles David Costanza (born April 30, 1969) is a United States Army major general who serves as the commanding general of the 3rd Infantry Division since June 21, 2021. He previously served as deputy chief of staff for operations, plans and training of the United States Army Forces Command from June 2020 to June 2021, with tours as deputy commanding general for support of the 1st Armored Division from June 2017 to June 2018 and commander of the 3rd Armored Brigade Combat Team, 3rd Infantry Division from May 2013 to May 2015.

References

Living people
1969 births
People from Colorado
Military personnel from Colorado
United States Military Academy alumni
United States Army Command and General Staff College alumni
United States Army War College alumni
Recipients of the Defense Distinguished Service Medal
Recipients of the Legion of Merit
United States Army generals